Cordelia Strube is a Canadian playwright and novelist.

Raised in Montreal, Quebec, Strube began her career as an actor. After winning a CBC Literary Award for her first radio play, Mortal, she wrote nine more radio plays for CBC Radio before publishing her debut novel, Alex & Zee, in 1994. The novel was a shortlisted nominee for the Books in Canada First Novel Award. Her third novel, Teaching Pigs to Sing, was a nominee for the English-language fiction award in the 1996 Governor General's Awards.

Her novel Lemon was named to the longlist for the 2010 Scotiabank Giller Prize and shortlisted for the 2010 Trillium Book Award. In 2016, she won the City of Toronto Book Award for On the Shores of Darkness, There Is Light.

Works

Novels
 Alex & Zee (1994)
 Milton's Elements (1995)
 Teaching Pigs to Sing (1996)
 Dr. Kalbfleisch and the Chicken Restaurant (1997)
 The Barking Dog (2000)
 Blind Night (2004)
 Planet Reese (2007)
 Lemon (2009)
 Milosz (2012)
 On the Shores of Darkness, There Is Light (2016)
 Misconduct of the Heart (2020)

Plays
 Fine (1985)
 Mortal (1986)
 Shape''' (1987)
 Scar Tissue (1987)
 Attached (1988)
 Caught in the Intersection (1988)
 Marshmallow (1988)
 Mid-Air (1989)
 Absconder (1989)
 On the Beach (1989)
 Past Due'' (1989)

References

External links
Cordelia Strube

Canadian women dramatists and playwrights
Canadian radio writers
Women radio writers
20th-century Canadian novelists
21st-century Canadian novelists
Canadian women novelists
Writers from Montreal
Living people
Anglophone Quebec people
20th-century Canadian dramatists and playwrights
20th-century Canadian women writers
21st-century Canadian women writers
1960 births